Dynamos FC is a Bahamian football club based in Nassau. The club competes in the BFA Senior League, the top tier of Bahamian football.

The club was founded in 1957, and play their home matches in the 1,700-capacity, Roscow A. L. Davies Soccer Field.

Squad

References

External links 
 BFA Club Profile

Football clubs in the Bahamas
1957 establishments in the Bahamas